Rhapsody: Child of Blood is a fantasy novel by American writer Elizabeth Haydon, the first book in The Symphony of Ages. It was first published in 1999 by Tor Books. The story is continued in Prophecy: Child of Earth.

Plot summary
The main story begins in Easton, when the protagonist Rhapsody finds herself in jeopardy, having refused the advances of Michael, the self-titled Wind of Death. In her attempt to get away, she falls in with two mysterious men named Grunthor and Achmed and soon finds herself the unwilling accomplice in their own escape. Though they run from their pasts, they eventually realize that no one can outrun their destinies.

Main characters
Rhapsody – Child of Sky, Namer and Singer. A young woman of human and Lirin descent, she is a talented musician who uses music as a force to change the world around her. Having suffered a great deal of trauma, she's become self-sufficient by necessity but is prone to bouts of melancholy when she thinks about all she has lost. Rhapsody is also unnaturally beautiful as a consequence of her journey, a fact that she refuses to acknowledge and brings her more trouble than fortune.
Achmed the Snake – Child of Blood, Assassin. A man of unknown age and mixed Dhracian and Firbolg heritage who leads Rhapsody and Grunthor on their journey, and who ultimately (by the climax of this book) unites the Firbolg race in the nation of Ylorc.
Grunthor – Child of Earth, Warrior. A gigantic man of mixed Firbolg and Bengard descent who is Rhapsody's first protector even before their journey begins. He is Achmed's loyal sergeant and follows him without question.

Miscellaneous
F'dor – Race of evil demons born of Fire
Serendair – Island where Time first began
Sagia – Oak of Deep Roots
Daystar Clarion – Legendary Star Sword from Serendair

Reviews
Review by Avril Brown (2001) in Vector 215
Review by Chris Gilmore (2001) in Interzone, #164 February 2001
Review by uncredited (2002) in Vector 221

See also 
 Prophecy: Child of Earth

References

External links 

1999 American novels
1999 fantasy novels
Symphony of Ages
Tor Books books